Indian Mesa Wind Farm is a wind farm located in Pecos County, Texas. The farm consists of one hundred twenty-five Vestas V-47 660 kilowatt wind turbines that produce up to 82.5 megawatts of electricity. Electricity produced by the project is purchased by the Lower Colorado River Authority (51 megawatts) and TXU (31.5 megawatts). The project is built on land owned by local ranches and the University of Texas. The project was completed in 2001 by Orion Energy LLC and development partner National Wind Power.

NextEra Energy Resources acquired the farm in June, 2002.

Energy infrastructure completed in 2001
Wind farms in Texas
Buildings and structures in Pecos County, Texas
2001 establishments in Texas
NextEra Energy